Aryeh Finkel (1931–2016) was a Haredi Rabbi and Rosh Yeshiva of the Mir Brachfeld branch of the Mir Yeshiva. Before assuming his post at the new yeshiva branch in 2005, he served as the Mashgiach at the Mir in Jerusalem for many decades.

Biography
Aryeh Finkel was the son of Rabbi Chaim Zev Finkel (1906–1965), founder of Yeshivas Heichal HaTorah in Tel Aviv and Mashgiach at the Mir in Jerusalem. He is the grandson of Rabbi Eliezer Yehuda Finkel, who led the yeshiva in Poland and brought it to Israel. He is a second cousin of Rabbi Nosson Tzvi Finkel, Rosh Yeshiva of the Mir from 1990 to 2011, and first cousin to the latter's wife. He is also
Rabbi Avigdor Nebenzahl's brother-in-law.
Finkel inherited his position as Mashgiach of the Mir from his father. He began serving in this position under Rabbi Chaim Leib Shmuelevitz.

He was the long-time Shaliach Tzibbur (cantor) for Rosh Hashana (Mussaf) and Yom Kippur (Kol Nidre, Maariv and Mussaf) at the Mir in Jerusalem.

References

External links
Video: Rav Aryeh Finkel lighting the menorah (2009)

1931 births
2016 deaths
Burials at Har HaMenuchot
Romanian Jews
People from Fieni
Israeli Rosh yeshivas
Haredi rabbis in Israel
20th-century rabbis in Jerusalem
21st-century rabbis in Jerusalem
Israeli settlers